Create is a UK creative arts charity (registered charity number 1099733) based in London and Manchester, which offers creative workshops and arts experiences led by professional artists in community settings, schools, day centres, prisons and hospitals.

The charity works with seven priority groups: young hospital patients; disabled children and adults; young, young adult and adult carers; schoolchildren (and their teachers) in areas of deprivation; vulnerable older people; young and adult prisoners (and their families); and marginalised children and adults (including LGBTQ+ young people, homeless people and refugees).

Patrons include: choreographer/director Sir Matthew Bourne OBE, writer Esther Freud, musician Dame Evelyn Glennie, composer/TV presenter Howard Goodall CBE, Royal Academician Ken Howard OBE, writer/ex-prisoner Erwin James, choreographer Shobana Jeyasingh CBE, pianist Nicholas McCarthy, writer/broadcaster/art historian Tim Marlow OBE, and writer/actress/comedian Isy Suttie.

History
Create was founded on 7 July 2003 from the dining room table of Chief Executive, Nicky Goulder, with the aim of empowering lives through the creative arts. Prior to this, Nicky was Chief Executive of the Orchestra of St John's. In 2013, Nicky won the Clarins Most Dynamisante Woman of the Year Award, which recognises "the action and commitment of inspirational British women who work tirelessly to help underprivileged or sick children across the globe."

Create has won more than 115 awards since 2012, including Charity Times's "Charity of the Year: with an income of less than £1 million" in 2020, and "Digital Transformation of the Year" in 2021.

In 2021/22, Create ran 981 workshops, delivering 13,439 contact hours with 1,367 disadvantaged and vulnerable children and adults.

Since 2003, Create has run 12,057 workshops, delivering 330,943 contact hours with more than 41,500 participants. Projects have been delivered across England, Scotland and Wales. Projects connect, empower, inspire and upskill participants, raising aspirations, reducing isolation and enhancing wellbeing. Each is rigorously evaluated to assess impact.

Selection of Projects

art:links is a cross-arts project which brings together vulnerable older people in day centres and care homes for friendship, self-expression and creative release, reducing isolation.
art:space and inspired:arts use film-making, photography, music, drama, creative writing and visual art to enable young carers to take time away from their caring responsibilities.
change:matters educates and upskills young carers across the UK on the topic of money and family finances through the creative arts.
creative:connection tackles disability prejudice, bringing disabled and non-disabled young people together to make visual art, music, film and more.
Inside Stories enables prisoners to write, record, illustrate and set to music their own stories for their children, while My Dad's In Prison gives prisoners a chance to write a children's book that promotes understanding of having a parent in prison.

Awards

Winner: 104 Koestler Awards since 2012
Winner: Charity Times Awards 2021 ~ Digital Transformation of the Year
Winner: Charity Times Awards 2020 ~ Charity of the Year: with an income of less than £1 million
Winner: Legal Week CSR Innovation (Collaboration) (Ashurst/Create) 2020
Winner: Children & Young People Now 2019 ~ Young Carers Award
Winner: Charity Awards 2017 ~ Arts, Culture and Heritage Award
Winner: East End Community Foundation ~ Smooth Sailing Award 2017
Winner: Foundation for Social Improvement ~ Small Charity Big Impact Award 2017
Highly Commended: Children and Young People Now 2017 ~ Young Carers Award
Highly Commended: Children and Young People Now 2017 ~ Youth Justice Award
Highly Commended: Children and Young People Now 2017 ~ Youth Work Award
Winner: Children and Young People Now 2016 ~ Arts and Culture Award
Winner: Creative Vision Award 2016
Winner: Charity Times Awards 2015 ~ PR Team of the Year: with an income of less than £1 million
Special Commendation: Royal Society for Public Health's Arts and Health Awards for Inside Stories (2013)
Winner: Business in the Community's South East Local Impact Award for art:space presented to sponsor British Land (2013)
The Lord Mayor's Dragon Award for Social Inclusion for creative:u~turn presented to sponsor Reed Smith (2012)

References

External links
Official website
Article on Create's dance workshops with older people in The Guardian
Article by CEO Nicky Goulder on the life-enhancing power of music on children in hospital in the Huffington Post
Article from The Independent on Create's dance project with young carers at Sadler's Wells
Article by CEO Nicky Goulder on disability prejudice and the arts in The Guardian
Report from Sky News on Create's visual art project with young carers in Canary Wharf
Article by rock band Biffy Clyro on their support of Create
Article by CEO Nicky Goulder on the Arts Council England website about delivering arts activities during lockdown
Article from Charity Times on how Create transformed its delivery during the COVID-19 pandemic
Article by CEO Nicky Goulder in The Stage on how theatre can empower young carers
Interview from Inside Time between Create Patron Erwin James and Create CEO Nicky Goulder about the charity's work in prisons

Arts organizations established in 2003
Charities based in London
Disability in the arts
Arts organisations based in the United Kingdom
2003 establishments in England
Arts charities